The Passagassawakeag River is a  river in Waldo County, Maine in the United States.  From the outlet of Lake Passagassawakeag in Brooks, it runs south and east to its estuary in Belfast, Maine. The river empties into Belfast Bay, an inlet of Penobscot Bay, where it passes under US Route 1.

The waterway's name is of local Native American origin and is believed to mean "a sturgeon's place" or "a place for spearing sturgeon by torchlight."

References

External links

Penobscot Bay
Rivers of Waldo County, Maine
Rivers of Maine